On Nuea is a tambon (subdistrict) of Mae On District, in Chiang Mai Province, Thailand. In 2018 it had a total population of 3,297 people.

Administration

Central administration
The tambon is subdivided into 10 administrative villages (muban).

Local administration
The whole area of the subdistrict is covered by the subdistrict administrative organization (SAO) On Nuea (องค์การบริหารส่วนตำบลออนเหนือ).

References

External links
Thaitambon.com on On Nuea
On Nuea SAO

Tambon of Chiang Mai province
Populated places in Chiang Mai province